This is a list of the main career statistics of professional German tennis player Laura Siegemund. She has won two singles titles on the WTA Tour. In doubles, she has won ten titles, including the 2020 US Open. She also won the 2016 US Open mixed doubles title.

Performance timelines

Only main-draw results in WTA Tour, Grand Slam tournaments, Billie Jean King Cup and Olympic Games are included in win–loss records.

Singles
Current through the 2023 Indian Wells Open.

Doubles
Current through the 2023 Indian Wells Open.

Mixed doubles

Significant finals

Grand Slam finals

Women's doubles: 1 (1 title)

Mixed doubles: 1 (1 title)

WTA 1000 finals

Doubles: 2 (1 title, 1 runner-up)

WTA career finals

Singles: 3 (2 titles, 1 runner-up)

Doubles: 15 (10 titles, 5 runner-ups)

ITF Circuit finals

Singles: 28 (14 titles, 14 runner-ups)

Doubles: 32 (20 titles, 12 runner-ups)

Head-to-head records

Record against top-10 players
Siegemund's record against players who have been ranked in the top 10, with those who are active in boldface.

Record against No. 11–20 players 
Siegemund's record against players who have been ranked world No. 11–20, with those who are active in boldface.

 Magda Linette 
 Jennifer Brady 
 Alizé Cornet 
 Karolína Muchová 
 Beatriz Haddad Maia 
 Mirjana Lučić-Baroni 
 Alison Riske-Amritraj 
 Klára Koukalová 
 Petra Martić 
 Anastasia Pavlyuchenkova 
 Markéta Vondroušová 
 Kirsten Flipkens 
 María José Martínez Sánchez 
 Anastasija Sevastova 
 Barbora Strýcová 
 Elena Vesnina 
 Mihaela Buzărnescu 
 Eleni Daniilidou 
 Ana Konjuh 
 Yanina Wickmayer 
 Ekaterina Alexandrova 
 Elise Mertens 
 Liudmila Samsonova 
 Varvara Lepchenko 

* Statistics correct .

Wins over top-10 players
Siegemund has a  record against players who were, at the time the match was played, ranked in the top 10.

National participation

Billie Jean King Cup (2–4)

United Cup (1–3)

References 

Siegemund